The following lists events that happened during  1955 in New Zealand.

Population
 Estimated population as of 31 December: 2,164,800
 Increase since 31 December 1954: 46,400 (2.19%)
 Males per 100 females: 101.2

Incumbents

Regal and viceregal
Head of State – Elizabeth II, Queen of New Zealand, from 6 February 1952
Governor-General – Lieutenant-General The Lord Norrie GCMG GCVO CB DSO MC, from 1952 to 1957

Government
The 31st New Zealand Parliament continued. In power was the National government under Sidney Holland.

Speaker of the House – Mathew Oram from 1950 to 1957
Prime Minister – Sidney Holland from 13 December 1949 to 20 September 1957.
Deputy Prime Minister – Keith Holyoake from 13 December 1949 to 20 September 1957.
Minister of Finance – Jack Watts from November 1954 until 20 September 1957
Minister of Foreign Affairs – Tom Macdonald from 26 November 1954 until 12 December 1957
Chief Justice — Sir Harold Barrowclough

Parliamentary opposition 
 Leader of the Opposition –   Walter Nash (Labour).

Main centre leaders
Mayor of Auckland – John Luxford from 1953 to 1956
Mayor of Hamilton – Roderick Braithwaite from 1953 to 1959
Mayor of Wellington – Robert Macalister from 1950 to 1956
Mayor of Christchurch – Robert M. Macfarlane from 1938 to 1941 and again from 1950 to 1958
Mayor of Dunedin – Leonard Morton Wright from 1950 to 1959

Events 

 A pulp and paper mill opens at Kawerau
 The Rimutaka rail tunnel opened
 The Marriage Act 1955 is passed

Arts and literature

See 1955 in art, 1955 in literature

Music

See: 1955 in music

Radio

See: Public broadcasting in New Zealand

Film

See: :Category:1955 film awards, 1955 in film, List of New Zealand feature films, Cinema of New Zealand, :Category:1955 films

Sport

Athletics
Arthur Lydiard wins his second national title in the men's marathon, clocking 2:42:34 in Auckland.

Chess
 The 62nd National Chess Championship was held in Auckland, and was won by Ortvin Sarapu of Auckland (his 4th successive title).

Horse racing

Harness racing
 New Zealand Trotting Cup – Our Roger
 Auckland Trotting Cup – Prince Polka

Lawn bowls
The national outdoor lawn bowls championships are held in Wellington.
 Men's singles champion – J.H. Rabone (Northern Bowling Club)
 Men's pair champions – W.R. Hawkins, M.G. Borich (skip) (Hamilton Bowling Club)
 Men's fours champions – J. Whitehead, E.A. Horan, A. Robinson, I.B. Evans (skip) (Omarunui Bowling Club)

Soccer
 The Chatham Cup is won by Western of Christchurch who beat Eastern Suburbs of Auckland 6–2 in the final.
 New Zealand played 3 matches against South China Athletic
18 June, Christchurch – 1–1 draw
2 July, Wellington – NZ win 7-4
9 July, Auckland – NZ lose 3-5
 Provincial league champions:
	Auckland:	Mount Albert GSOB
	Bay of Plenty:	Mangakino Utd
	Buller:	Millerton Thistle
	Canterbury:	Western
	Hawke's Bay:	Napier Rovers
	Manawatu:	Kiwi United
	Nelson:	Motueka
	Northland:	Otangarei United
	Otago:	King Edward Technical College OB
	Poverty Bay:	Eastern Union
	South Canterbury:	West End
	Southland:	Invercargill Thistle
	Taranaki:	Old Boys
	Waikato:	Huntly Thistle
	Wanganui:	Wanganui Athletic
	Wellington:	Stop Out

Births
 16 January: Steve Wooddin, soccer player
 14 February: Margaret Knighton, equestrian eventer
 31 March: Robert Vance, cricketer
 2 April: Steve Sumner, soccer player
 21 April: Tuheitia Paki, Māori King
 27 May: Graham 'Jock' Edwards, cricketer
 1 June: Lorraine Moller, long-distance athlete
 19 June: Mary O'Connor, long-distance runner
 29 September: Mark Graham, rugby league footballer and coach
 1 November: Anne Audain, middle and long-distance athlete
 12 November: Roger Sumich, cyclist
 26 November: Barbara Tilden, field hockey player
 2 December: Mark Gosche, politician
 7 December: Te Ururoa Flavell, politician
 David Hamilton, composer

Deaths
 31 January: Bob Semple, trade union leader and politician.
 7 May: Melville Lyons, politician
 24 May: Louis Hekenui Bidois, policeman
 5 June (in England): George Skellerup, industrialist
 7 September: Henry Braddon, rugby union player.
 14 December: William Stewart, politician. 
 Undated: John Guthrie (at sea) journalist and novelist.

References

See also
List of years in New Zealand
Timeline of New Zealand history
History of New Zealand
Military history of New Zealand
Timeline of the New Zealand environment
Timeline of New Zealand's links with Antarctica

 
Years of the 20th century in New Zealand